The canton of Vernon is an administrative division of the Eure department, northern France. It was created at the French canton reorganisation which came into effect in March 2015. Its seat is in Vernon.

It consists of the following communes:
Gasny
Giverny
Sainte-Geneviève-lès-Gasny
Vernon

References

Cantons of Eure